"Love Hurts" is a song written and composed by the American songwriter Boudleaux Bryant. First recorded by the Everly Brothers in July 1960, the song is most well known from the 1974 international hit version by Scottish hard rock band Nazareth and 1975 Top 5 hit in the UK by English singer Jim Capaldi.

Appearances
The song was introduced in October 1960 as an album track on A Date with The Everly Brothers but was never released as a single (A-side or B-side) by the Everlys. Due to a falling out with their manager and publisher Wesley Rose they were prevented from issuing it as a single, though it had been meant for them. It was after the quarrel was settled in 1964 that they rerecorded it for the 1965 album Rock 'n' Soul.

The first hit version of the song is by Roy Orbison, who earned Australian radio play, hitting the Top Five of that country's singles charts in 1961.

A recording by Emmylou Harris and Gram Parsons is included on Parsons' posthumously released Grievous Angel album. After Parsons' 1973 death, Harris made the song a staple of her repertoire and has included it in her concert setlists from the 1970s to the present. Harris has since re-recorded the song twice.

The Who performed the song on their 1967 U.S. tour.

The most successful recording of the song is by Scottish hard rock band, Nazareth, who took the song to the U.S. Top 10 in 1975 and hit No. 1 in Norway and the Netherlands.

In the UK, the most successful version of the song is by former Traffic member, Jim Capaldi, who took it to No. 4 in the charts in November 1975 during an 11-week run.

The song was also covered by Cher in 1975 for her album, Stars; Cher re-recorded the song in 1991 for her album of the same name.

Jennifer Warnes released a version on her 1976 self-titled album.

Joan Jett includes a version on her 1990 album, The Hit List, a covers compilation.

Heart offers a live unplugged rendition on their 1995 live album, The Road Home, also included on the album's 1995 VHS concert video and later on its 2003 DVD reissue.
Rod Stewart recorded the song in 2006 for his album, Still the Same... Great Rock Classics of Our Time, which was No. 1 on the Billboard 200 chart. Jazz guitarist Julian Lage performs the song on his 2019 album of the same name.

The bluegrass version appearing in both the Deadpool 2 "Super Duper Cut" and the "Once Upon A Deadpool" DVD during the montages featuring the titular character's suicide attempts following Vanessa's death, was first recorded by The Osborne Brothers for their 1977 release, From Rocky Top to Muddy Bottom: The Songs of Boudleaux & Felice Bryant.

Mexican band Yndio covered in Spanish with the title Herida de amor ("Love's wound") in 1976.

Roy Orbison version 

Roy Orbison covered "Love Hurts" in 1961 and issued it as the B-side to "Running Scared." While "Running Scared" was an international hit, the B-side only picked up significant airplay in Australia. Consequently, chart figures for Australia show "Running Scared"/"Love Hurts" as a double A-Side, both sides peaking at No. 5. This makes Orbison's recording of "Love Hurts" the first version to be a hit.

Nazareth version 

Performed as a power ballad, the Nazareth version is the most popular version of the song and the only rendition of "Love Hurts" to become a hit single in the United States, reaching No. 8 on the Billboard Hot 100 in early 1976. Billboard ranked it as the No. 23 song for 1976. As part of the "Hot Tracks (EP)" it also reached No. 15 in the UK in 1977. Nazareth's version was an international hit, peaking at No. 1 in Canada, the Netherlands, Belgium, South Africa and Norway. The Nazareth single was so successful in Norway that it charted for 61 weeks on the Norwegian charts (VG-lista Top 10), including 14 weeks at No. 1, making it the top single of all time in that country.

A later recording by Nazareth, featuring the Munich Philharmonic Orchestra, peaked at No. 89 in Germany.

The lyrics of the song were changed for Nazareth's 1975 recording, where the original line "love is like a stove/it burns you when it's hot" was changed to "love is like a flame/it burns you when it's hot".

Cher covered this version for her 1991 album of the same name.

Media 
The song was used in an advertisement for Esurance, and also in a series of advertisements by Zurich.

A cover was sung by Nan Vernon for the film Halloween II.

The song has been featured in several films and television shows, including Modern Romance, Dazed and Confused, Can't Hardly Wait, That '70s Show, King of the Hill, Detroit Rock City, Scrubs, Click, Supernatural, and Gotham.

Charts and certifications

Weekly charts

Year-end charts

All-time chart

Certifications

Jim Capaldi version 

Jim Capaldi reached number 4 in the UK charts with his interpretation of "Love Hurts" in November 1975, which was to prove his highest-charting UK single. Described by Rolling Stone as having "a sense of pain very different from Roy Orbison's." the single also charted in the US, Germany, and Sweden.

Weekly charts

Year-end charts

Cher version 

American singer Cher recorded her first version in 1975 for the album Stars but did not release this version as a single. She later recorded a second version in 1991 for her album of the same name. This version was a cover of Nazareth's version. The single became a minor hit in the UK in December 1991.

Track listing
European 7-inch and cassette single
"Love Hurts" – 4:19
"One Small Step" – 3:27

European 12-inch and CD single
"Love Hurts" – 4:19
"One Small Step" – 3:27
"Just Like Jesse James" – 4:06

Charts

See also
List of 1970s one-hit wonders in the United States

References 

1960 songs
1960s ballads
1974 singles
1975 singles
1991 singles
2001 singles
2005 singles
Nazareth (band) songs
The Everly Brothers songs
Roy Orbison songs
Cher songs
Rod Stewart songs
Jim Capaldi songs
Number-one singles in Norway
RPM Top Singles number-one singles
Number-one singles in South Africa
Song recordings produced by Richie Zito
Songs written by Felice and Boudleaux Bryant
Torch songs
Rock ballads
Warner Records singles
Monument Records singles
A&M Records singles
Vertigo Records singles
Mooncrest Records singles
Island Records singles
Geffen Records singles